Madame Bovary is a 1934 French historical drama film directed by Jean Renoir, starring Max Dearly, Valentine Tessier and Pierre Renoir, and adapted from Gustave Flaubert's 1857 novel Madame Bovary.

Plot summary

Cast

Critical reception
On the film's original release, Variety wrote that in interpreting the novel for film, "Renoir has done an exceptionally commendable job. Regardless of its snail-like pace, the production, combines a straight simple narrative with a fine sense of background authenticity and dramatic understanding." The reviewer doubted however, that box office appeal would extend much beyond readers of the book, "despite the better than average quality of the film."

References

Bibliography 
 Donaldson-Evans, Mary. Madame Bovary at the Movies: Adaptation, Ideology, Context. Rodopi, 2009. 
 Goble, Alan. The Complete Index to Literary Sources in Film. Walter de Gruyter, 1999.

External links 
 
 
 

1934 films
French historical drama films
French black-and-white films
Films about infidelity
1930s historical drama films
1930s French-language films
Films directed by Jean Renoir
Films set in France
Films set in the 19th century
Films based on Madame Bovary
Films scored by Darius Milhaud
1934 drama films
1930s French films